Qurbani is a 1980 Indian Hindustani action thriller film produced, directed by and starring Feroz Khan (under the banner of FK International). The film co-stars Vinod Khanna, Zeenat Aman, Amjad Khan, Shakti Kapoor, Aruna Irani, Amrish Puri and Kadar Khan. Qurbani was famous for its music, especially the Bollywood disco song "Aap Jaisa Koi" sung by Pakistani popstar Nazia Hassan and produced by Biddu, as well as the song "Laila O Laila".

The film is based on the 1972 Italian action crime movie The Master Touch.
It was later remade into Tamil as Viduthalai starring Rajinikanth, Vishnuvardhan and Madhavi with Sivaji Ganesan, which was a moderate success at the box office, however, over the years the film has achieved a cult following.

Plot
Rajesh (Feroz Khan) was a motorcycle stuntman in a circus and is now a thief, expert in breaking open treasuries. In one such robbery, he is being watched by police inspector Amjad Khan (Amjad Khan). Sheela (Zeenat Aman) is a gorgeous disco club dancer and singer. Rajesh and Sheela are in love. Rajesh has not disclosed to Sheela that he is a thief. Inspector Amjad Khan arrests Rajesh for theft after he is seen by an officer at a traffic accident. The court sentences Rajesh to two years' imprisonment. Sheela is devastated after she realises Rajesh was a thief. Rajesh meets Vikram in jail. The evil brother-sister duo, Vikram (Shakti Kapoor) and Jwaala (Aruna Irani) seek revenge against crime boss Rakka (Amrish Puri), who cheated Jwaala and siphoned her money.

Meanwhile, Amar (Vinod Khanna) is an ace crime member in Rakka's gang who revolts against Rakka. He is a widower with a daughter Tina (Natasha Chopra) studying in a boarding school. However, before quitting Rakka's gang, Amar has committed a crime, masked,  and inspector Amjad Khan is investigating that case. Amar saves Sheela from a gang of rowdy bikers. They meet regularly as Sheela likes Amar's daughter Tina. Soon, Amar begins to love Sheela, who does not reciprocate because she still loves Rajesh. After a short time, Amar and Sheela get together. Rajesh completes his jail sentence. While returning, he meets Vikram who again reminds him of the deal to rob Rakka. During the conversation, Amar incidentally reaches the site and a fist fight ensues between Amar and Vikram. While fleeing, Vikram swears revenge against Amar. Thus Rajesh and Amar meet for the first time. Rajesh takes Amar to introduce him to Sheela; Sheela and Amar pretend as if they do not know each other since they don't want Rajesh to unnecessarily suspect them.

Later, Vikram's goons kidnap Amar's daughter and beat Amar, who is hospitalized. In return for Amar and his daughter's safety, Rajesh agrees to do Vikram's job. He nurses Amar back to normal and soon they turn thick friends. Amar promises Rajesh he will support him in this one last robbery. They plan to shift to London after the robbery with the money. They concoct a scheme whereby Amar would steal gold bars and jewellery from a safe, phone the police, let Rajesh take over, get arrested, and get a prison term for about 12 to 18 months. After his release, he will join Amar in the UK. Things don't go according to plan as Rajesh gets arrested for killing Rakka, while Amar and Sheela reach London with the money. Rajesh construes that Amar deliberately framed him so that he can get Rajesh out of the way, keep all the money (as well as Sheela) for himself. Rajesh escapes from jail and reaches London to apprehend Amar. After a brief tussle, Rajesh realizes the truth and that Amar did not frame him. Vikram and his goons reach London to take revenge against Rajesh and Amar. In the climax of the movie, Amar sacrifices his life to save Rajesh, Sheela and Tina from getting killed by Vikram.

Cast
Feroz Khan as Rajesh Kumar
Vinod Khanna as Amar
Zeenat Aman as Sheela
Amjad Khan as Police Inspector Amjad Khan
Shakti Kapoor as Vikram Singh
Amrish Puri as Rakka
Aruna Irani as Jwaala Singh
Kader Khan as Joe
Tun Tun as Fat Woman
Jagdeep as Mohammad Ali
Dinesh Hingoo as Parsi Man
Viju Khote as Vikram's Man
Mac Mohan as Mac

Production
It began filming in 1979, and was one of the most expensive Indian films at the time. Cine Blitz suggested in 1979 that the production costs of Qurbani may exceed Abdullah, another similarly expensive production at the time.

To draw shock from the audience, a scene was included with the calculated decimation of a Mercedes Benz in an underground parking lot. This was at a time when not many in India had seen a Mercedes, let alone sat in one.

UK stunts were designed and arranged by James Dowdall, photographed by Eric Van Herren and produced by Nick Farnes who, with James Dowdall, wrote the UK scenario.

Feroz Khan initially asked Amitabh Bachchan to play the role of Amar. Amitabh replied he would be available in 6 months, according to Feroz, but Feroz could not wait that long. So the role of Amar went to Vinod Khanna.

Box office
It was going to be released on 27 June 1980 and clash with Karz but the sudden demise of Sanjay Gandhi who died on 23 June 1980, release was postponed for one week and finally it was released on 4 July 1980 with bumper opening and became the Biggest All Time Blockbuster of the year, with a gross revenue of 12 crore (net income of 6 crore) at the Indian box office in 1980. This is equivalent to US$15.26 million in 1980, or US$ million (330 crore) in 2018.

Music

Biddu was the music director for the song "Aap Jaisa Koi", which introduced him and Pakistani singer Nazia Hassan to Indian films. The first initial song Biddu recorded for Qurbani was a Hindi version of a Boney M. song. When Nazia Hassan and Zoheb Hassan heard it, they refused saying they didn't want to sing a copy. They insisted they wanted an original song. A reluctant Biddu asked them what they had in mind. That's when "Aap Jaisa Koi" was born.

The movie is known for its music and songs, including the title qawwali "Qurbani Qurbani", written by the Urdu poet, Faruk Kaiser and rendered by  
Kishore Kumar, Anwar, and Aziz Nazan. Qurbani Qurbani received a special award for 'The Most Amazing Evergreen Song' by Bollywood music producer, Kalyanji–Anandji.

The rest of the songs and the background score were set by Kalyanji–Anandji. The song "Laila O Laila" was also very popular. The album was written by Faruk Kaiser and Indeevar.It has a song performed by Mohammed Rafi, Kya Dekhte Ho, which was written by Indeevar.

Feroz Khan met Biddu and Nazia Hassan at a party hosted by a close friend in England. Nazias parents insisted Feroz listen to Nazia sing. Feroz did and was highly impressed. But Feroz had his eye on International star Biddu to score a song for Qurbani. Biddu was reluctant to score music for an Indian film. It was with sincere persistence and Feroz telling Biddu to do it for his mom who lived in India. Feroz also played the Bangalore card with Biddu since both Feroz and Biddu both hailed from Bangalore.

Many music directors (including the film's original music directors Kalyanji–Anandji) opposed Feroz Khan hiring Biddu to score a solo song in the film. Many tried to stop this because they viewed Biddu as an outsider. After several discussions, Feroz Khan stuck to his choice.

Track listing

Reception
Its songs were popular and the movie sold the most number of records and tapes in 1980. The music and songs ushered in the "Disco Revolution" of the Indian subcontinent that lasted until the mid-1980s. "Aap Jaisa Koi", sung by Nazia Hassan and produced by Biddu, had a strong impact on audiences.

Qurbani was 1980's best-selling soundtrack album in India, and the sixth best-selling Bollywood soundtrack of the 1980s. Faruk Kaiser was awarded the Golden Disc accolade when Qurbani exceeded 500,000 units sold in India. The album then went Platinum within seven months, a record for the Indian music industry at the time, selling 1million units.

The song "Laila O Laila" was recreated in the film Raees with the title Laila Main Laila, sung by Pawni Pandey featuring Sunny Leone.

"Aap Jaisa Koi" was Remixed and Remade various times notably during the 2000's Remix Era, Sung by Akriti Kakkar (For Baby Doll Fully Loaded Remix album by Saregama), Sung by Sophie Chaudhary. In 2022 it was Remade for the film "An Action Hero" sung by Zarah S Khan & Altamash Faridi, with music recreated by Tanishk Bagchi, featuring Malaika Arora & Ayushmann Khurana.

Awards

 28th Filmfare Awards:

Won

 Best Female Playback Singer – Nazia Hassan for "Aap Jaisa Koi"
 Best Sound Design – P. Harikishan

Nominated

 Best Actor – Vinod Khanna
 Best Supporting Actor – Amjad Khan
 Best Music Director – Kalyanji–Anandji
 Best Female Playback Singer – Kanchan for "Laila O Laila"

Remakes
Qurbani was remade in Turkish as Çare Sende Allahım directed by Yılmaz Atadeniz in 1984, which Behçet Nacar in Feroz Khan’s role and Müslüm Gürses in Vinod Khanna’s role, and in Tamil as Viduthalai in 1986 by producer K. Balaji. The film had Rajnikant in Feroz Khan's role and Dr. Vishnuvardhan in Vinod Khanna's role and was shot in the United States, but was an average hit.

Notes

References

Bibliography

External links 
 

1980 films
1980s crime action films
1980s heist films
1980s Hindi-language films
Films directed by Feroz Khan
Films scored by Kalyanji Anandji
Films scored by Biddu
Hindi films remade in other languages
Indian crime action films
Indian heist films
1980s masala films
Urdu films remade in other languages
1980s Urdu-language films
Urdu-language Indian films